The Courtship of O San is a 1914 American short silent drama film directed by Charles Miller and featuring Sessue Hayakawa, Tsuru Aoki and Mr. Yoshida in the lead roles.

References

External links 
 

1914 films
1914 drama films
Silent American drama films
American black-and-white films
Films directed by Charles Miller
1914 short films
American silent short films
1910s English-language films
1910s American films
American drama short films